Rattan Lal (born 5 September 1944) is a soil scientist. His work focuses on regenerative agriculture through which soil can help resolve global issues such as climate change, food security and water quality.

He was awarded the 2019 Japan Prize 'for the sustainable soil management for global food security and mitigation of climate change.'

On June 11, 2020, Professor Lal was named the recipient of the prestigious  World Food Prize-2020. His research diverged from the conventional 1970s soil fertility strategy of heavy reliance on commercial fertilizers. His research led a better understanding of how no-till farming, cover crops, crop residues, mulching, and agroforestry can restore degraded soils, increasing organic matter by sequestering atmospheric carbon in the soil, and help combat rising carbon dioxide levels in the air.

Education
Lal received his B.S. from Punjab Agricultural University, Ludhiana; M.S. from Indian Agricultural Research Institute, New Delhi and Ph.D. from the Ohio State University.

Career and research
Lal worked as a senior research fellow with the University of Sydney from 1968 to 1969, and then as a soil physicist at IITA, Ibadan, Nigeria, from 1970 to 1987. In 1987 he returned to Ohio State University, where as of 2019 he was a distinguished university professor of soil science and director of the Carbon Management and Sequestration Center.

He was president of the International Union of Soil Science from 2017 to 2018.

Awards and honors
Arrell Global Food Innovation Award 2020 
 Padma Shree Award 2021
 Borlaug Award 2005
 Von Liebig award 2006 
 Glinka World Soil Prize 2018 
 Japan Prize 2019
 The World Food Prize 2020
 Good Will Ambassador of IICA, Interamerican Institute for  cooperation on Agriculture, 2020

References

1944 births
Living people
People from Punjab, Pakistan
Indian emigrants to the United States
American academics of Indian descent
American soil scientists
Agriculture and food award winners
Presidents of the International Union of Soil Sciences